The Secretary of Government of Brazil (Portuguese: Secretaria de Governo do Brasil) is a cabinet-level federal minister in Brazil. The current Secretary of Government is Flávia Arruda.

List of secretaries
Ricardo Berzoini (2 October 2015 to 12 May 2016)
Geddel Vieira Lima (12 May 2016 to 25 November 2016)
Antônio Imbassahy (3 February 2017 to 8 December 2017)
Carlos Marun (15 December 2017 to 1 January 2019)
Carlos Alberto dos Santos Cruz (1 January 2019 to 13 June 2019)
Luiz Eduardo Ramos (13 June 2019 to 29 March 2021)
Flávia Arruda (29 March 2021 to 31 March 2022)
Célio Faria Júnior (since 31 March 2022)

References

External links

 Official Website of the Secretary of Government of Brazil

Executive branch of Brazil